Juan Infante (born 7 January 1996) is an Argentine professional footballer who plays as a left-back for Platense.

Career
Platense gave Infante his start in senior football. Mariano Rukaviña selected Infante for his debut on 8 September 2014 during a win away from home against Deportivo Morón, prior to picking him to start again on 19 September versus Comunicaciones. Infante featured forty-four times for Platense in his opening three campaigns. In August 2016, Infante was loaned to Primera División side Talleres. He remained for 2016–17, though failed to make a first-team appearance; only appearing for their academy. He returned to Platense in 2017–18, subsequently netting his first goal in a draw with Comunicaciones; in which he was also sent off.

Career statistics
.

Honours
Platense
Primera B Metropolitana: 2017–18

References

External links

1996 births
Living people
People from José C. Paz Partido
Argentine footballers
Association football defenders
Primera B Metropolitana players
Primera Nacional players
Club Atlético Platense footballers
Talleres de Córdoba footballers
Sportspeople from Buenos Aires Province